"Black Velvet" is a song written by Canadian songwriters Christopher Ward and David Tyson, and recorded by Canadian singer-songwriter Alannah Myles. It was released in January 1990 as one of four singles from Myles' 1989 eponymous album from Atlantic Records. It became a number-one hit for two weeks on the Billboard Hot 100 chart in 1990 and reached number one on the Album Rock Tracks chart, as well as number ten in her native Canada and number two on the UK Singles Chart. The song also reached number one in Norway, Sweden, and Switzerland and was a major success in several other countries. It contains blues verses with a rock chorus.

Myles won the 1991 Grammy for Best Female Rock Vocal Performance for the song and the 1990 Juno Award for Single of the Year. Since its release, the song has received substantial airplay, receiving a "Millionaire Award" from ASCAP in 2005 for more than four million radio plays.

Background and writing
The song is a paean to Elvis Presley, whose portrait was often painted on black velvet, and who used a hair dye named Black Velvet. Co-writer Christopher Ward, who was Myles' then-boyfriend, was inspired on a bus full of Elvis fans riding to Memphis attending the 10th anniversary vigil at Graceland, in 1987. Upon his return to Canada, he brought his idea to Alannah and producer David Tyson, who wrote the chords for the bridge. The song was one of three in a demo Myles presented to Atlantic Records, which eventually got her signed to the label.

Atlantic Records, much to the disappointment of Myles for whom the song had been written, gave the song to country artist Robin Lee to record. In the United States, Myles' version was released in December 1989, while Lee's version was released two months later in February 1990. This led to Myles being promoted by Atlantic on the pop and rock radio stations, and Lee on the country radio stations. Lee even filmed a videoclip of the song very similar to Myles' video.

Myles released a new version of the song on a digitally released Elvis tribute EP in August 2007 to commemorate the 30 years since his death. It was later included on her 2008 Black Velvet CD.

The song is performed in the key of E minor, with a swinging tempo of 92 beats per minute in  time. Myles' lead vocals span from E3 to E5 in the song.

One aspect of the song listeners have frequently noted is the tune's distinctive fretless bassline. While a common belief holds that the melody was played using an actual fretless bass guitar, Myles' bassist for the rest of her self-titled album, Steve Webster, acknowledged in an online discussion forum that he did not perform the bassline on "Black Velvet" himself; rather, it was Tyson who played the riff on a synthesizer, using a fretless bass sample.

Reception

Critical reception
Music & Media described the song as "a blues ballad featuring some straight-from-the-heart vocals from Miles and inspired guitar playing".

Commercial reception
As the second single of Myles' debut album, it was first released in her native Canada in July 1989. It peaked at number 10 in September of that year, becoming the first of four top-10 hits for Myles in her homeland. Worldwide, it was released as Myles' debut single. It was released in the United States in December 1989 and worldwide in early 1990, becoming a top-10 hit in most countries where it was released. It peaked at number one in four countries: Norway, Sweden, Switzerland, and the United States and received gold and platinum discs in several countries. This would go on to be her biggest hit in the US, leading to her being seen as a one-hit wonder there.

Music video
The music video, directed by Doug Freel, was partially shot on Myles' family ranch in Buckhorn, Ontario. Myles is seen singing on a cabin porch with her guitarist, Kurt Schefter (Raving Mojos), intercut with scenes from Myles in concert with her band. The concert scene was filmed in Kingston, Ontario, in a bar called Stages.

Track listings

CD maxi
 "Black Velvet" – 4:40
 "If You Want To" – 4:11
 "Who Loves You" – 3:36

7" single
 "Black Velvet" – 4:02
 "If You Want To" – 4:11

12" maxi
 "Black Velvet" – 4:40
 "If You Want To" – 4:11
 "Who Loves You" – 3:36

Charts

Weekly charts

Year-end charts

Certifications

Other versions

Country music artist Robin Lee, also signed to Atlantic at the time, covered "Black Velvet" in 1990 on her third studio album, also titled Black Velvet. Lee's version peaked at No. 12 on the US Billboard Hot Country Singles & Tracks (now Hot Country Songs) chart.

Canadian-American singer-songwriter and actress Alexz Johnson performs an a cappella cover of "Black Velvet" in the 2005 film Selling Innocence. It is her character Angel DeSousa's swan song in a talent contest just before she is stalked and tragically murdered.

Idols South Africa winner Anke Pietrangeli covered the song on her album Tribute to the Great Female Vocalists in 2009.

"Black Velvet" has also been recorded by Valentina Gautier (as "Hey tu" Italian), Gee Gee & Soluna featuring Soluna Samay, Bert Heerink (as "Rocksterren" Dutch), Vicky Rosti (as "Yön helmaan" Finnish), Jackie Thomas, and Sandi Thom.

"Black Velvet" was recorded by the group The Lost Fingers "Lost in the 80s" in 2008. It was also roughed up and recorded by Canadian Rock artist Kami and released on her single "Death Toll Rising" in January 2013.

In 2015, Canadian heavy metal band Kobra and the Lotus recorded the song for their first EP, entitled Words of the Prophets.

In 2021, X Factor winner Sam Bailey recorded the song as her rock debut. The song was released through independent record label Saga Entertainment on August 6, 2021. The song peaked at number one on the Amazon best sellers chart.

In 2022, Infected Mushroom released a cover of the song featuring Ninet Tayeb. It was released through record label Monstercat and is to be featured on Infected Mushroom's IM25 album.

Chart performance for Robin Lee version

See also
 List of Billboard Hot 100 number-one singles of 1990
 List of European number-one airplay songs of the 1990s

References

1989 songs
1989 singles
1990 singles
Alannah Myles songs
Billboard Hot 100 number-one singles
Black-and-white music videos
Cashbox number-one singles
Number-one singles in Norway
Number-one singles in Sweden
Number-one singles in Switzerland
Robin Lee Bruce songs
Songs about Elvis Presley
Songs written by David Tyson
Songs written by Christopher Ward (songwriter)
Atlantic Records singles
Grammy Award for Best Female Rock Vocal Performance
Rock ballads
1980s ballads
Juno Award for Single of the Year singles
Country ballads